Kozoluk is a village in Tarsus district of Mersin Province, Turkey. It is situated in the southern slopes of Toros Mountains at .. The population of village is 154 as of 2012.

References

Villages in Tarsus District